Working with Fire and Steel – Possible Pop Songs Volume Two is the second studio album by English new wave and synth-pop band China Crisis, released on 31 October 1983 by Virgin Records.

The album spent 16 weeks on the UK Albums Chart, peaking at No. 20 in February 1984. It includes the song "Wishful Thinking", which was a Top 10 hit on the UK Singles Chart.

Content and recording
The songs "Wishful Thinking" and "Here Come a Raincloud" (then called "Watching the Rainclouds") were premiered on a BBC John Peel session in January 1983, along with "A Golden Handshake for Every Daughter", which was not included on the album but released as the b-side of the single "Tragedy and Mystery" in May. The album was recorded at Amazon Studios, Liverpool and The Manor Studio, Oxfordshire in 1983. Some of the songs had been written around the same time as the songs on the bands debut studio album, Difficult Shapes & Passive Rhythms, Some People Think It's Fun to Entertain (1982). The band also recorded the song "It's Never Too Late" during the sessions for the album, but it was dropped from the tracklisting for having a similar arrangement to "Wishful Thinking" and was later released on a limited edition 12" single of "Black Man Ray".  The arrival of full time drummer Kevin Wilkinson into the band's line-up saw a much lesser reliance on electronic drums, and gave the album a markedly less synthetic sound than its predecessor.

Single releases
"Tragedy and Mystery" was released as a single in May 1983 with "A Golden Handshake for Every Daughter" as the B-side, peaking at No. 46 on the UK Singles Chart. The title track "Working with Fire and Steel" was released as a single a few weeks before the album in October 1983 with two non-album instrumentals, "Dockland" and "Forever I and I", on the B-side, reaching No. 48 in the UK. "Wishful Thinking" was released in December and became the bands first and only Top 10 hit in the UK, peaking at No. 9 in January 1984. The fourth and final single "Hanna Hanna" was released in March 1984 with a live version of "African and White" as the B-side, reaching No. 44.

Critical reception

In a retrospective review for AllMusic, critic Stephen Schnee described the album as "chock full of intelligent, well-written pop songs" where "even the softer moments...are full of life and excitement". The reviewer noted that the band moved away from their early synthpop-style to more ambitious ideas with "Producer Mike Howlett added much to the sonic blend, allowing the melodies to shine while toughening up the band's sound... Apart from their own matured sound on this release, there are traces of rock, pop, and jazz floating between the lines."

Track listing

In 2017 the album was re-released as a 3 CD 'Super Deluxe' edition by Caroline Records. This 37 track set included rare extended versions, demos plus John Peel and Kid Jensen radio sessions. Many of these tracks appeared on CD for the first time however, there were some strange omissions and additions. The track "Some People I Know to Lead Fantastic Lives" was originally on the band's debut studio album Difficult Shapes & Passive Rhythms, Some People Think It's Fun to Entertain (1982) yet that same album version is included as well as the extended mix. There is no extended version of "Wishful Thinking" yet the very same album version appears twice.

Personnel
Credits are adapted from the Working with Fire and Steel – Possible Pop Songs Volume Two liner notes.

China Crisis
Gary Daly — vocals; synthesizer; grand piano; E-mu Emulator; tape
Eddie Lundon — acoustic and electric guitars; synthesizer; E-mu Emulator; vocals
Gary "Gazza" Johnson — bass guitar; fretless bass; bass harmonica
Kevin Wilkinson — drums; percussion

Additional musicians
Steve Levy — saxophone (tracks 1–3); oboe (tracks 5–7)
Graeme Levy — voice (Russian dialect) (track 1)
Roddy Lorimer — trumpet (tracks 2 & 3)
Anthony Thistlethwaite — tenor saxophone (tracks 2 & 3)
Jane Lancaster — vocals (tracks 5 & 9)
Robert Pollard — synthesiser (track 7)
Luke Tunney — flugelhorn (track 7)
Gary Barnacle — flute (track 9)
The Breck Road String Ensemble — strings (track 5)

Charts

Weekly charts

Year-end charts

Certifications

References

External links

1983 albums
China Crisis albums
Albums produced by Mike Howlett
Virgin Records albums